The 6L80 (and similar 6L90) is a six-speed automatic transmission built by General Motors at its Willow Run Transmission plant in Ypsilanti, MI. It was introduced in late 2005, and is very similar in design to the smaller 6L45/6L50, produced at GM Powertrain in Strasbourg, France. It features clutch to clutch shifting, eliminating the one-way clutches used on older transmission designs. In February 2006 GM announced that it would invest $500 million to expand the Toledo Transmission plant in Toledo, Ohio to produce the 6L80 in 2008. Torque rating 440 ft/lb (600 nm). 6L90 1220ft/lb (2000 nm).

Specifications

Technical data

Applications

 2006–2009 Cadillac XLR-V
 2006-2013 Chevrolet Corvette
 2006 Holden VE Commodore/2008-2009 Pontiac G8
 2006-2013 Holden/Chevrolet WM Statesman/Caprice
 2014-2017 Holden/Chevrolet WN Statesman/Caprice
 2007-2014 Chevrolet Silverado 2500HD/3500 HD 6.0 (6L90)
 2007-2014 GMC Sierra 2500HD/3500HD 6.0 (6L90)
 2007-2013 GMC Sierra Denali
 2009-2013 Chevrolet Silverado 1500 5.3 (ext. & crew cab), 6.2  
 2009-2013 GMC Sierra 1500 5.3 (ext. & crew cab), 6.2 
 2010-2013 Chevrolet Silverado 1500 5.3 (reg. cab)  
 2010-2013 GMC Sierra 1500 5.3 (reg. cab)  
 2006-2009 Cadillac STS-V
 2007-2015 Cadillac Escalade
 2007-2015 Cadillac Escalade ESV
 2007-2013 Cadillac Escalade EXT
 2010-present Chevrolet Express 2500-3500 (6L90-E)
 2010-present GMC Savana 2500-3500 (6L90-E)
 2007-2015 GMC Yukon Denali
 2009-2020 Chevrolet Tahoe
 2009-2020 GMC Yukon
 2009-2020 Chevrolet Suburban 1500
 2008-2013 Chevrolet Suburban 2500 (6L90)
 2009-2020 GMC Yukon XL
 2008-2009 Hummer H2
 2009-2013 Cadillac CTS-V (6L90)
 2014-2019 (K2XX) Chevrolet Silverado/GMC Sierra 1500
 2010-2015 Chevrolet Camaro
 2011-2017 Chevrolet Caprice PPV
 2012-2015 Chevrolet Camaro ZL1 (6L90)
 2011(September)-2013  Holden VE Commodore Series 2(MY 2012)
 2014-2017  Holden VF Commodore / Chevrolet SS
 2009-2013 Chevrolet Avalanche
 2015-2019 Chevrolet Silverado 2500HD/3500 HD 6.0 (6L90)
 2015-2019 GMC Sierra 2500HD/3500HD 6.0 (6L90)
 2019-2021 (T1XX) Chevrolet Silverado/GMC Sierra 1500
 2020-present Chevrolet Silverado 2500HD/3500 HD 6.6 L8T (6L90)
 2020-present GMC Sierra 2500HD/3500HD 6.6 L8T (6L90)

See also
 List of GM transmissions
 Cadillac PDF info on 6L80-E Transmission: http://www.cadillacfaq.com/stsfaq/tsb/data/tsb/05-07-30-023.pdf

References

6L80